Druon fullawayi, also known as the yellow wig gall wasp, is a species of gall wasp in the family Cynipidae. It was previously placed in the genus Andricus. William Beutenmüller described the female adult wasps as 1.5-2.25 mm long, black with brown mouth parts and brown legs. The galls of D. fullawayi are tan or yellow, woolly, and measure 5-8 mm in diameter. Each gall holds a single chamber for larvae. They are found in California on oak trees, especially Quercus lobata.

References

External links
 Druon fullawayi on gallformers

Cynipidae
Gall-inducing insects
Oak galls
Insects described in 1913
Taxa named by William Beutenmuller
Hymenoptera of North America